Usnea hirta is a species of beard lichen in the family Parmeliaceae. It was one of 80 lichen species first formally described by Carl Linnaeus in his 1753 work Species Plantarum. Friedrich Heinrich Wiggers transferred it to the genus Usnea in 1780. The lichen is sensitive to air pollution, and is often used as a biomonitor of sulphur dioxide. Usnea hirta has an extensive worldwide distribution, and it is morphologically variable, which has led to numerous intraspecific taxa (i.e. subspecies, varieties, and forms) being proposed in its taxonomic history.

References

hirta
Lichen species
Lichens described in 1753
Taxa named by Carl Linnaeus
Lichens of Africa
Lichens of Europe
Lichens of North America
Cosmopolitan species